The Minister for Local Government is a position in the Cabinet of Western Australia, first created in 1949 during the McLarty–Watts Ministry. The minister, who may also hold other portfolios, is responsible for the relationships between the state government and the local government areas of Western Australia, often facilitated through the WA Local Government Association (WALGA). The current Minister for Local Government is John Carey of the Labor Party, who holds the position as a member of the McGowan Ministry.

List of Ministers for Local Government
22 people have been appointed as Minister for Local Government in Western Australia, with Leslie Logan's 11 years and 335 days the longest time period in the position. From the early 1950s through to the 1980s, the Minister for Local Government was generally also the Minister for Town Planning, although the portfolios were always created separately. In the table below, members of the Legislative Council are designated "MLC". All others were members of the Legislative Assembly at the time of their service. In Western Australia, serving ministers are entitled to be styled "The Honourable", and may retain the style after three years' service in the ministry.

References

Local government
Ministers, Local government